5 de Diciembre is a colonia (neighborhood) in Puerto Vallarta, in the Mexican state of Jalisco.

Description and features
The neighborhood is north of Centro and features Playa Camarones, Plaza Hidalgo, and Parroquia Nuestra Señora del Refugio. The colonia is home to many ex-pats. Residents have complained about the presence of sex workers.

References

Neighbourhoods in Mexico
Puerto Vallarta